Rona Peters (born 21 May 1988) is a New Zealand rugby league footballer who plays for the Tweed Heads Seagulls in the QRL Women's Premiership and Runaway Bay Seagulls in the SEQW Premiership.

A New Zealand and Queensland representative, Peters started her career as a half before moving into the forwards. She previously played for the Brisbane Broncos in the NRL Women's Premiership, winning two Grand Finals with the club.

Background
Born in Auckland, Peters played her junior rugby league for the Papakura Sea Eagles. Her sisters, Hilda and Kahurangi, are also New Zealand Test representatives.

Playing career
In 2003, Peters began playing for the Manurewa Marlins senior team as a 15-year old and was selected in the Auckland representative team. Later that year, she represented New Zealand at the 2003 Women's Rugby League World Cup.

On 9 November 2014, Peters played alongside her sisters, Hilda and Kahurangi, in New Zealand's 12–8 win over Australia.

In 2015, Peters moved to the Gold Coast, Queensland and joined the Burleigh Bears.

On 23 July 2016, she made her debut for Queensland in a 4–8 loss to New South Wales at Cbus Super Stadium. In June 2018, she represented South East Queensland at the Women's National Championships.

2018
On 28 June, Peters joined the Brisbane Broncos NRL Women's Premiership team. In Round 1 of the 2018 NRL Women's season, she made her debut for the Broncos in a 30–4 win over the St George Illawarra Dragons.

2019
On 18 April, Peters was ruled ineligible from Women's State of Origin, as new rules introduced removed the residency rule, under which Peters qualified for Queensland. This was later overturned and she was given special dispensation, as she had retired from international rugby league in 2015, before she first represented Queensland.

2020
In 2020, Peters joined the Souths Logan Magpies in the QRL Women's Premiership. In October, she made herself unavailable for the 2020 NRL Women's season due to COVID-19 restrictions. On 13 November, she started at prop for Queensland in their 28–18 win over New South Wales.

2021
In 2021, Peters joined the Tweed Heads Seagulls. On 20 February, she represented the Māori All Stars in their 24–0 win over the Indigenous All Stars.
19th August 2021 Gold Coast Titans announce the signing of Peters for Gold Coast Titans NRLW Team.

References

External links
NRL profile

1988 births
Living people
New Zealand Māori rugby league players
New Zealand female rugby league players
New Zealand women's national rugby league team players
Rugby league locks
Rugby league props
Rugby league halfbacks
Brisbane Broncos (NRLW) players
Rugby league players from Auckland